"Thought Contagion" is a song by English rock band Muse. It was released as the second single from the band's eighth studio album, Simulation Theory, on 15 February 2018, following "Dig Down", released the previous year. The single debuted at number 76 on the UK Singles Chart and topped the UK Rock & Metal Singles Chart.

Writing and recording
"Thought Contagion" was released as a single and music video on 15 February 2018. Speaking to Rolling Stone magazine, Muse front man Matt Bellamy revealed that the song was written in late 2017, explaining that "I came up with the bass line and then I used a theremin, originally, to [create] this lead melody that went over the top." This melody was later changed, with Bellamy noting that "it occurred to me that the theremin melody would be a cool, anthemic sort of vocal part, so [bassist] Chris [Wolstenholme] and I did about ten passes on that to create this sort of crowd effect on the vocal".

Composition and lyrics
In an interview with Beats 1 presenter Matt Wilkinson, Bellamy explained that the lyrics of "Thought Contagion" are based on the theory "that thoughts are contagious [and that] they spread like a virus, or like genes", noting that he had read about the idea in a book by Richard Dawkins. The singer has also admitted that the lyrical content of the song is likely influenced by "watching American news stations", detailing that "The verses are me streaming off anxieties and feelings, which ... I'm wondering whether they're actually mine or not". Musically, Bellamy has described "Thought Contagion" as "a pretty epic and anthemic track", pointing out its "arena sound and synths" as examples of the band's process of "getting into blending genres and eras together" for their upcoming eighth studio album.

Music video
The music video for "Thought Contagion" was directed by Lance Drake, who also directed the band's previous video "Dig Down", and features "vampires who can manipulate lightning, neon-drenched streets, old arcade cabinets and a Thriller-type dance routine". Billboard writer Nina Braca also compared the video to Michael Jackson's Thriller, describing it as "[an] intense '80s-inspired zombie love story", while Spin magazine's Andy Cush called it "an '80s-indebted video about sexy vampires and riot police".

Charts

Weekly charts

Year-end charts

References

External links
"Thought Contagion" music video on YouTube

2018 songs
2018 singles
Muse (band) songs
Warner Records singles
Songs written by Matt Bellamy